Olympia High School may refer to:

Olympia High School (Orlando, Florida)
Olympia High School (Stanford, Illinois)
Greece Olympia High School (Rochester, New York) 
Olympia High School (Olympia, Washington)
Olympian High School (Chula Vista, California)